Eric Arden Youngstrom, Ph.D. is an American clinical child and adolescent psychologist, professor of psychology and neuroscience, and psychiatry, at University of North Carolina at Chapel Hill. He is a Fellow of the American Psychological Association. His research focuses on evidence-based assessment, and assessment of bipolar disorder across the life span.

Work 
Youngstrom's research areas are evidence-based assessment and the assessment, phenomenology, and course of illness for youths with bipolar disorder. He has developed or co-developed several self- and parent-report psychological measures, including the parent version of the General Behavior Inventory and the 7 Up 7 Down Inventory.

Professional roles and memberships 
Youngstrom was the inaugural recipient of the Early Career Award from the Society of Clinical Child and Adolescent Psychology. He is a Fellow of the American Psychological Association, the Association for Psychological Science, and the Association for Behavioral and Cognitive Therapy. He is also an elected full member of the American College of Neuropsychopharmacology. He was president of the Society of Clinical Child & Adolescent Psychology. He served as President-Elect of APA Division 5, Quantitative and Qualitative Methods in 2019, is serving as president in 2020, and will serve as Past-President in 2021.

Youngstrom consulted on the fifth revision of the Diagnostic and Statistical Manual (DSM-5). He chairs the Work Group on Child Diagnosis for the International Society for Bipolar Disorders.

References

External links
 The University of North Carolina-Chapel Hill profile

Cognitive-behavioral psychotherapists
21st-century American psychologists
Living people
University of Delaware alumni
University of North Carolina at Chapel Hill faculty
1968 births
20th-century American psychologists